Melicope contermina  is a species of shrub or small tree in the family Rutaceae and is endemic to Lord Howe Island. It has trifoliate leaves and white flowers borne in leaf axils in panicles of nine to fifteen flowers.

Description
The flowers on each plant are bisexual, sometimes male-only, female only, or both male-only and female-only.

Taxonomy
Melaleuca contermina was first formally described in 1871 by Charles Moore and Ferdinand von Mueller in Fragmenta phytographiae Australiae from specimens collected near the base of Mount Gower on Lord Howe Island. The specific epithet comes from the Latin con (“with”) and terminus (“end”), with reference to the styles being joined at their ends.

Distribution and habitat
This species is endemic to Lord Howe Island where it grows in forest and on open ridges. It is somewhat rare, but is most often seen in Erskine Valley, between Mount Lidgbird and Mount Gower, at the southern end of the island.

References

contermina
Endemic flora of Lord Howe Island
Plants described in 1871
Sapindales of Australia
Taxa named by Ferdinand von Mueller
Taxa named by Charles Moore